Urban Mazanovský (born 17 December 2003) is a Slovak footballer who plays for MŠK Púchov as a defender.

Club career

AS Trenčín
Mazanovský made his Fortuna Liga debut for AS Trenčín against Nitra on 11 July 2020 during a Relegation Group 0:3 defeat. Trenčín was, however, assured a place in the next season prior to the game.

References

External links
 AS Trenčín official club profile
 Futbalnet profile
 

2003 births
Living people
Sportspeople from Topoľčany
Slovak footballers
Slovakia youth international footballers
Association football defenders
AS Trenčín players
FK Dubnica players
MŠK Púchov players
Slovak Super Liga players
2. Liga (Slovakia) players